Juan Angel Martini Jr. (born 5 August 1945) is an Argentine former sports shooter. He competed in the trap event at the 1968 Summer Olympics. His father also competed at the Olympics as a sports shooter.

References

1945 births
Living people
Argentine male sport shooters
Olympic shooters of Argentina
Shooters at the 1968 Summer Olympics
Sportspeople from Buenos Aires